St Mawnan and St Stephen's Church, Mawnan is a Grade II* listed parish church in the Church of England Diocese of Truro in Mawnan, Cornwall, England, UK.

History
The church dates from the 13th century with the tower dating from the 14th and 15th centuries. It was restored in 1827 when the north wall was rebuilt. The chancel roof was restored by the vicar in 1861 and a further restoration took place in 1879 to 1880 under the direction of the architect James Piers St Aubyn. It was by then in a ruinous state and no longer possible to worship within. In the 1880 restoration considerable portions of the north and south walls were rebuilt, and several new windows were inserted. The chancel and east window of the north aisle were filled with stained glass, and in the north-east corner a new window of coloured glass was inserted in memory of M. Nowell Peters who died in 1880. The contractor for the restoration was Messrs May of Pool, and it cost £1,500. The church reopened on 30 June 1880.

The patron saint is Mawan, Mawnan or Mawganus, who appears to have settled in the neighbourhood in the 6th century.

There is a fragment of a cross head built into the north aisle wall; it was found in the churchyard in 1881.

Rectors of Mawnan

Parish status
The church is in a joint parish with:
St Michael's Church, Mawnan Smith

Organ

The church had an organ by J. W. Walker & Sons Ltd dating from 1875 which was originally in All Saints’ Church, Marazion. It has subsequently been enlarged by Hele & Co and Lance Foy. A specification of the organ can be found on the National Pipe Organ Register.

References

Mawnan
Mawnan
Grade II* listed buildings in Cornwall
National Heritage List for England
Buildings and structures in Cornwall
St Mawnan and St Stephen's Church